Palpusopsis is a monotypic snout moth genus described by Hans Georg Amsel in 1959. Its only species, Palpusopsis roseella, described by the same author, is known from south-eastern Iran.

References

Taxa named by Hans Georg Amsel
Phycitinae
Monotypic moth genera
Moths of Asia
Pyralidae genera